Pattan is a sub-district, town and a municipal committee in Baramulla district in the Indian union territory of Jammu and Kashmir.

Location
Pattan is surrounded by Breng Block towards North, Kunzer block towards the south, Narbal block towards east, Singhpora block towards west. This place is near the border of the Baramulla, Budgam and Ganderbal districts. Budgam district and Beerwah are south of this place.

History

This historical town is considered to have been established by the famous Hindu king Shankarvarman, son of Awantivarman of Utpala dynasty, in the 9th century AD. As per Kalhana's Rajatarangini, Shankarvarman built a town named Pattana. Pandits write it as ‘Pathan’, ‘The Path’, as it falls on the important route to Baramulla. During ancient times Pattan was a business center for wool, livestock and grains. Shankarvarman had built two temples at Pattan town dedicated to Shiva. He named one of the temples after his wife, Sugandha, as Sugandhesa and the other temple was named as Shankargaurishwar. To the north of these two temples was a lake known as “PumpeSar” (Lotus Lake),where now stands a residential area.

Geography
Pattan is one of the historical capitals of Kashmir valley, located nearly in the centre of the valley. Pattan tehsil has remains of four palaces including two in the municipal limits.

Transport

Pattan is accessible through Pattan railway station, Hamre railway station and Mazhom railway station. Via Jammu-Srinagar National Highway, it is only  from Summer Capital Srinagar.

Demographics
As of 2011 India census, Pattan had a population of 19,538 of whom 12,580 are males and 6,958 are female. Literacy rate of Pattan  is 74.28% higher than the erstwhile state average of 67.16%. In Pattan, Male literacy is around 83.92% while female literacy rate is 55.91%. Population of children with age of 0-6 is 2,053 which is 10.51% of total population age.

See also
Lolipora

References

Cities and towns in Baramulla district
Kashmir
Baramulla district